The College of Humanities and Social Sciences (KNUST) is a college in Kumasi, Ghana.

The college, like all five others, were established on 4 January 2005, following the promulgation of the new statutes. The college started with four academic Faculties: Art, Law, School of Business and Social Sciences, and a Research Centre; Centre for Cultural and African Studies. It was named College of Arts and Social Sciences.

After a decade of growth the university decided to restructure the college to enhance efficiency in management. At the beginning of the 2014/2015 academic year the University Council approved the transfer of the Faculty of Art from the college to reconstitute the College of Art and Built Environment. Consequently, the college now has three Faculties i.e. Law, Social Science and the School of Business and the Research Centre.

Following the departure of the Faculty of Art the name of the college has changed to College of Humanities and Social Sciences (CoHSS). Not withstanding these changes, the college remains the watershed of knowledge for all faculties in the university, offering diverse and cross cutting courses to the numerous departments in the university. This is based on the philosophy that the sciences need a modicum of the liberal arts to function effectively in their various professions. Since the human and social aspects in the various fields of academia are inevitable, the college's contribution towards the achievement of the university's mandate cannot be underestimated. The college is therefore central in the quest for relevant knowledge creation in the university. The activities of the college also help in reducing the tension and stress associated with laboratory and studio-based programmes, and orient the scientists to mainstream society in any scientific and technological innovations.

Academics 
The College of Humanities and Social Sciences is an amalgamation of three Faculties, fourteen (14) Departments and a Research Centre. The amalgamation was in line with the university's objective to achieve good governance and academic excellence through restructuring of academic and administrative units into Colleges.

Faculty of Social Sciences 
 Department of Economics
 Department of English
 Department of Geography & Rural Development
 Department of History & Political Studies
 Department of Modern Languages
 Department of Sociology & Social Work
 Department of Religious Studies

Faculty of Law 
 Department of Commercial Law
 Department of Private Law
 Department of Public Law

KNUST School of Business 
 Department of Supply Chain and Information Systems
 Department of Marketing and Corporate Strategy
 Department of Human Resource and Organizational Development
 Department of Accounting and Finance

Research 
 Centre for Cultural and African Studies

List of Students’ Association Presidents
 Solomon Dickson 2020-2021
 Ben-Carl Dzobgo 2019-2020
 Kwadwo Nketia Fidelis 2018-2019
 Dennis Sarpong 2017-2018
 Joshua Budu 2016-2017
 George Acquaye 2015-2016
 Henry Adjei 2014-2015
 Ahmed Salim Nuhu 2013-2014
 Fugah Caleb 2012-2013
 Edem Klu Joseph 2011-2012
 Dziwornu Richard Kovor 2021-2022

List of Students’ Association Vice Presidents 
 Raphael Quainoo Junior 2020-2021
 Herbert Afriyie 2019-2020
 Samuel Kyeremateng 2018-2019
 Benjamin Kodua Nti Darkwa Kodua 2021-2022

References 

Kwame Nkrumah University of Science and Technology
Education in Ghana